Kham District  is a district (muang) of Xiangkhouang province in north-central Laos.

References

Districts of Xiangkhouang province